Henry Barnett is the name of:

 Henry Barnett (banker) (1815–1896), English MP
 Henry Walter Barnett (1862–1934), Australian photographer and filmmaker
 Henry J. M. Barnett (1922–2016), Canadian medical researcher